Richard Fedor Leopold Dehmel (18 November 1863 – 8 February 1920) was a German poet and writer.

Life 
A forester's son, Richard Dehmel was born in Hermsdorf near Wendisch Buchholz (now a part of Münchehofe) in the Brandenburg Province, Kingdom of Prussia.

He got his first impressions of nature wandering the oak forests tended by his father, and first attended school in his hometown. He then attended the Sophiengymnasium (a Berlin gymnasium) yet was expelled after clashing with the headteacher. He finished his school days in Danzig and subsequently studied the natural sciences, economics, literature, and philosophy, first at Friedrich Wilhelm University in Berlin and then at Leipzig University, where he obtained a doctorate in economics with a thesis on the insurance industry. He then worked as a secretary at a fire insurance association, and remained in this position until, after the publication of his second volume of poetry, he turned full-time writer.

In 1889, Dehmel married Paula Oppenheimer, sister of Franz Oppenheimer. He became active as a writer and co-founded Pan magazine in 1894. Dehmel divorced Paula in 1899 and traveled Europe with Ida Auerbach (née Coblentz), who had formerly been engaged to Dehmel's rival Stefan George. Dehmel married Ida in 1901, and that same year they settled in Hamburg.

Dehmel's poetic volume Weib und Welt (Woman and World) triggered a scandal in the late 1890s: denounced by the deeply conservative poet Börries von Münchhausen, Dehmel was tried for obscenity and blasphemy. Despite being acquitted on technical grounds, the court condemned the work as obscene and blasphemous and ordered that it be burned. Dehmel would again be prosecuted for obscenity and blasphemy, but again acquitted as earlier.

Dehmel was a champion of the rights of workers. However, despite his record of fighting conservatives, Dehmel joined the many patriotic and pro-war German intellectuals who inveighed the masses to support the German Empire after the outbreak of the First World War in 1914. Fifty-one at the time, Dehmel volunteered in 1914 and served until 1916, when he was wounded. He called on the Germans to keep fighting right until 1918. Dehmel died in 1920 in Blankenese from the after-effects of an injury sustained during the war.

Literary work 
Dehmel is considered one of the foremost German poets of the pre-World War I era. His poems are finished in form and use numerous metrical patterns. They were set to music by composers such as Richard Strauss (who met his principal librettist Hugo von Hofmannsthal at Dehmel's house), Max Reger, Alexander von Zemlinsky, Arnold Schoenberg, Luise Schulze-Berghof, Oskar Fried, Alma Mahler, Anton Webern, Ignatz Waghalter, Carl Orff, and Kurt Weill, or they inspired them to write music. Dehmel's main theme was "love and sex (Eros)", which he framed as a power to break away from middle-class values and fetters.
In particular, his poem "Verklärte Nacht" (see that article for the poem) was set by Schoenberg in two versions and has been often performed.

Works 
 Erlösungen, poems 1891
 Aber die Liebe, poems 1893
 Weib und Welt, poems 1896
 Zwei Menschen. Roman in Romanzen, 1903
 Die Verwandlungen der Venus, poems 1907
 Michel Michael, comedy 1911
 Schöne wilde Welt, poems 1913
 Die Menschenfreunde, Drama 1917
 Mein Leben, autobiography 1922 (posthumously)

References

External links
 Willkommen zur Richard-Dehmel-Website at www.richard-dehmel.de 
 Richard Dehmel in Project Gutenberg 
 All poems of Richard Dehmel 
 
 

1863 births
1920 deaths
People from Dahme-Spreewald
People from the Province of Brandenburg
German socialists
19th-century German poets
19th-century German male writers
19th-century German writers
German male poets
German-language poets
20th-century German poets
20th-century German male writers
Writers from Brandenburg
People prosecuted for blasphemy
German military personnel of World War I
German magazine founders